Kelly Airport  is a public use airport in West Carroll Parish, Louisiana, United States. It is owned by the West Carroll Parish and located one nautical mile (2 km) southwest of the central business district of Oak Grove, Louisiana.

This airport is included in the National Plan of Integrated Airport Systems for 2011–2015, which categorized it as a general aviation facility.

Facilities and aircraft 
Kelly Airport covers an area of 28 acres (11 ha) at an elevation of 112 feet (34 m) above mean sea level. It has one runway designated 18/36 with an asphalt surface measuring 3,000 by 60 feet (914 x 18 m).

For the 12-month period ending March 13, 2012, the airport had 10,000 general aviation aircraft operations, an average of 27 per day. At that time there were 5 aircraft based at this airport: 60% single-engine and 40% ultralight.

See also 
 List of airports in Louisiana

References

External links 
 Aerial image as of January 1998 from USGS The National Map
 

Airports in Louisiana
Transportation in West Carroll Parish, Louisiana
Buildings and structures in West Carroll Parish, Louisiana